The Venetian regional election of 2005 took place on 3–4 April 2005.

Giancarlo Galan (Forza Italia, House of Freedoms) was re-elected for the third time in a row President of the Region, but the support for him was diminished by the presence of a third candidate, Giorgio Panto, who picked votes both from the centre-right and the Venetist camps, and of a fourth candidate representing the far right, Roberto Bussinello.

Although Forza Italia remained the largest party in the Council and also in the Region as a whole (The Olive Tree was only an electoral alliance at the time and the three parties which were part of it formed separate groups in the Council), it suffered a serious decline in term of votes, from 30.3% of 2000 to 22.7%.

Venetist parties had a very good result: the combined score of Liga Veneta (14.7%), North-East Project (5.4%) and Liga Fronte Veneto (1.2%) was 21.3%, up from the 15.6% of 2000 (Liga Veneta 12.0%, Veneti d'Europa 2.4% and Fronte Marco Polo 1.2%).

Electoral system
Regional elections in Veneto were ruled by the "Tatarella law" (approved in 1995), which provided for a mixed electoral system: four fifths of the regional councilors were elected in provincial constituencies by proportional representation, using the largest remainder method with a droop quota and open lists, while the residual votes and the unassigned seats were grouped into a "single regional constituency", where the whole ratios and the highest remainders were divided with the Hare method among the provincial party lists; one fifth of the council seats instead was reserved for regional lists and assigned with a majoritarian system: the leader of the regional list that scored the highest number of votes was elected to the presidency of the Region while the other candidates were elected regional councilors.

A threshold of 3% had been established for the provincial lists, which, however, could still have entered the regional council if the regional list to which they were connected had scored at least 5% of valid votes.

The panachage was also allowed: the voter can indicate a candidate for the presidency but prefer a provincial list connected to another candidate.

Parties and candidates

Results

Council composition

Aftermath
After the election, Giancarlo Galan formed his third government. Due to the new strength of Liga Veneta, which received about 2/3 of the vote for Forza Italia, the coalition balance was clearly changed in favour of Liga Veneta. This party had both the post of President of the Regional Council for Marino Finozzi and the most important ministry, the Health ministry, for Flavio Tosi (who was replaced by Francesca Martini in 2007). 

Also the post of Vice President of Veneto went to a lighista, Luca Zaia, in place of Fabio Gava (Forza Italia), who had been also Minister of Health in second term. Forza Italia was indeed far less strong than in 2000, when it won 30.3% of the vote: in comparison with 2000, Forza Italia lost three regional deputies, while Liga Veneta had a net gain of four.

References

Elections in Veneto
2005 elections in Italy